IVAR is a brand of backpacks known for a patented ergonomic and organizational file-like design called the IVAR-LIFT Design. The concept was created originally by Ian Ivarson in 1998, who was a high school student at the time. Following graduation from college, Ivarson launched IVAR in July 2006 from Marin County, California.

Company background
In 1998, an entrepreneurial Ian Ivarson conceived and designed an internal shelf system for backpacks with an aim to create better organization and weight distribution ergonomics. At the time, Ivarson was a high school student at Marin Catholic in Kentfield, California. Early prototypes were developed with a sewer in Berkeley, California, and eventually progressed to direct relationships with unionized factories in Asia. During early development, Ivarson also filed for patents. Until the actual launch of IVAR, development of the IVAR backpack was slow as Ivarson was a college student and student-athlete during most that time.

Following graduation from the University of Denver, Ivarson launched IVAR in July 2006 with one single daypack model from an office and warehouse on Bank Street in San Anselmo, California.

Over the years, IVAR’s retail distribution reached a height of over 300 retail doors. Today, the brand is sold primarily online, yet also in an array of brick and mortar retailers in the sporting goods, outdoor, luggage, and bookstore categories.

As reported by the Travel Goods Showcase magazine by the Travel Goods Association, IVAR has operated with a charitable mission. The company has donated over 2,000 backpacks ($120,000+ in value) primarily to in-need youths in Africa. 

The IVAR-LIFT Design is patented, protected under no. 6474524. Ivarson USA LLC, formed in California in April 2002, is the owner of IVAR. The Company is supported by and managed, according to their website, by a network of designers and business development professionals.

External links

IVAR: Official Website
“San Rafael man touts design of more efficient backpack,” Marin Independent Journal
“Leaders of the packs: Help kids choose wisley,” The Denver Post
IVAR Facebook Page Resource

Companies based in Marin County, California
Luggage brands
Manufacturing companies based in California
American brands